Patrick McCann is an American soccer player.

Career 
McCann played four years of college soccer at College of the Holy Cross between 2009 and 2012. While at college, McCann also appeared for USL PDL side Brooklyn Knights in 2012.

In 2013, McCann joined Irish side Finn Harps. Following this spell, McCann had a brief stint in Spain with Brenes Balompié, before trialling with United Soccer League side New York Red Bulls II. He returned to Ireland with Sligo Rovers in 2016.

MCann signed with USL side Richmond Kickers on February 14, 2017.

References

External links
 https://www.richmond.com/sports/professional/soccer/kickers-mccann-flourished-during-three-year-sojourn-in-ireland/article_782a563c-2222-5af2-b115-a37aeb849b2a.html
 https://donegalnews.com/2013/08/from-the-bronx-to-ballybofey-mccann-settling-in-to-life-at-harps/
 https://www.independent.ie/sport/soccer/league-of-ireland/harps-midfielder-mccann-targets-an-american-dream-30637274.html

1990 births
American soccer players
Soccer players from New York (state)
Holy Cross Crusaders men's soccer players
Brooklyn Knights players
Finn Harps F.C. players
Sligo Rovers F.C. players
Richmond Kickers players
USL League Two players
USL Championship players
Living people
People from Rockville Centre, New York
Association football midfielders